New Row is a hamlet in the  community of Pontarfynach, Ceredigion, Wales, which is 66.5 miles (107 km) from Cardiff and 169.5 miles (272.7 km) from London. Rhes Newydd is represented in the Senedd by Elin Jones (Plaid Cymru) and is part of the Ceredigion constituency in the House of Commons.

References

See also
List of localities in Wales by population 

Villages in Ceredigion